Matthias Röder (born February 4, 1972 (age 47) is a German sprint canoer who competed in the 1990s. He won three medals at the ICF Canoe Sprint World Championships with a gold (C-2 1000 m: 1997) and two bronzes (C-1 1000 m: 1991, 1993).

Röder also finished fourth in the C-1 1000 m event at the 1992 Summer Olympics in Barcelona.

References

External links

1972 births
Canoeists at the 1992 Summer Olympics
German male canoeists
Living people
Olympic canoeists of Germany
ICF Canoe Sprint World Championships medalists in Canadian